Almaly may refer to:

Almaly, Azerbaijan, a village in Dashkasan District
Almalı, Dashkasan, another village in Dashkasan District, in the municipality of Zinzahal, Azerbaijan
Almalı, Khojali, Azerbaijan
Almalı, Qakh, Azerbaijan
Almaly (Almaty Metro), a railway station in Almaty, Kazakhstan